Mount Elk Lick is a 6,517-foot-elevation (1,986 meter) mountain summit located in the Olympic Mountains, in Jefferson County of Washington state. It is situated within Olympic National Park, and is set within the Daniel J. Evans Wilderness at the head of Elk Lick Creek. The nearest neighbor is Mount La Crosse,  to the west, and the nearest higher neighbor is Diamond Mountain,  to the north-northwest. Precipitation runoff from the mountain drains south into the Duckabush River, and north into the Dosewallips River. Topographic relief is significant as the south aspect rises over 4,300 feet (1,310 m) above the Duckabush valley in approximately one mile. The mountain is remote and an ascent can take four days and involves 46 miles of hiking.

Climate

Based on the Köppen climate classification, Mount Elk Lick is located in the marine west coast climate zone of western North America. Most weather fronts originate in the Pacific Ocean, and travel east toward the Olympic Mountains. As fronts approach, they are forced upward by the peaks of the Olympic Range, causing them to drop their moisture in the form of rain or snowfall (Orographic lift). As a result, the Olympics experience high precipitation, especially during the winter months. During winter months, weather is usually cloudy, but due to high pressure systems over the Pacific Ocean that intensify during summer months, there is often little or no cloud cover during the summer. The months June through September offer the most favorable weather for climbing or viewing the mountain.

History

The mountain's name was officially adopted in 1961 by the United States Board on Geographic Names. The mountain and the creek derive their names from mineral licks located along the Dosewallips and Duckabush rivers near here, where elk and deer drink water.

The first ascent of the peak was made in 1971 by Bartlett Burns, Hugh Favero, and Frank King.

Geology

The Olympic Mountains are composed of obducted clastic wedge material and oceanic crust, primarily Eocene sandstone, turbidite, and basaltic oceanic crust. The mountains were sculpted during the Pleistocene era by erosion and glaciers advancing and retreating multiple times.

See also

 Olympic Mountains
 Geology of the Pacific Northwest

References

External links
 Mount Elk Lick: Weather forecast
 Mt. Elk Lick photo: Flickr
 

Olympic Mountains
Mountains of Jefferson County, Washington
Mountains of Washington (state)
Landforms of Olympic National Park
North American 1000 m summits